The list of ship commissionings in 1864 includes a chronological list of all ships commissioned in 1864.


References

See also 

1864
 Ship commissionings